The County of Álava was one of the Basque señoríos, a feudal territory during the 9th and 13th centuries that corresponds to present-day Álava, in the Basque Country. Until the final invasion and incorporation into the Kingdom of Castile in the year 1200, the county was governed by counts vassals of the Kingdoms of Asturias, León and Navarre, being under the sphere of influence of one or the other at different times. The figure governing Alava received the title of Count of Álava.

Counts of Álava 

The Counts of Álava were the governing figures of the County of Álava and were, at different times, under the sphere of influence of the kingdoms of Asturias, Navarre and, ultimately, Castile.

Vassals of the Asturian monarchs 

|-
| Eyloc. 868 || ||  ||  || 
|-
| Rodrigo of CastileAlso first Count of Castilec.860-c.870 || || Unknown || Egilona || 873
|-
| Vela JiménezAlso known as Vigila Scemenizc.882-c.897 || || Unknown || Velasquita Sáncheztwo children || Unknown
|-
| Gonzalo TéllezKnown as Count of Lantaron and Cerezoc.897-c.919 || || Unknown || Flámula || 915
|-
| Munio VélazKnown as Monnio Uigilazi in Alabac.919 || || UnknownSon of Vela Jiménez and Velasquita Sánchez || Velasquitafour children || 919
|-
| Fernando Díaz923 || || UnknownSon of Diego Rodríguez Porcelos || Unknown || Unknown
|-
| Álvaro HerramélizKnown as Count of Lantaron and Álavac929-931 || || Unknown || Sancha Sánchez of Pamplonatwo children || Unknown 
|-
| Fernán González of CastileAlso Count of Castile932-970 ||  || c.910Son of Gonzalo Fernández of Castile and Muniadona of Lara || Sancha Sánchez of Pamplona, widow of Álvaro Herramelizseven children || 970
|-
| García Fernández of CastileOf the white handsAlso Count of Castile970-995 ||  || 938Son of Fernán González of Castile and Sancha Sánchez of Pamplona || Ava of Ribagorzaseven children || 995
|-
| Sancho García of CastileAlso Count of Castile995 || || c.965Son of García Fernández of Castile and Ava of Ribagorza || Urraca Gómezfive children || 1017
|}

Vassals of the Navarrese monarchs 

|-
| Munio Gonzálezc.1030 || || Unknown || Unknown || Unknown
|-
| Fortún Íñiguezc.1043 || || Unknown || Unknown || Unknown
|-
| Munio Muñozc.1045 || || Unknown || Unknown || Unknown
|-
| Alvaro Díaz known as Don Marceloc.1056 || || Unknown || Goto López || before July 1072
|}

Vassals of the Castilian monarchs 

|-
| Lope ÍñiguezAlso Lord of Biscayc.1076 || || c.1050Son of Íñigo López and Toda Fortunez || Ticlo Díazfive children || 1093
|-
| Lope González c.1093 || || Unknown || Unknown || Unknown
|-
| Lope Sánchez c.1099 || || Unknown || Unknown || Unknown
|-
| Diego Lópezthe WhiteAlso Lord of Biscay1093–1124 || || 1075Son of Lope Íñiguez and Ticlo Díaz || María Sánchezthree children || 1124
|-
| Ladrón Íñiguezc.1130 || || Unknown || Unknown || Unknown
|-
| Lope Díazthe one from NájeraAlso Lord of Biscay1125–1170 || || UnknownSon of Diego López and María Sánchez || Aldonzaeleven children || 6 May 1170
|-
| Vela LadrónVela from NavarreAlso Lord of Biscayc.1155 || || 1115Son of Ladrón Íñiguez || Unknown ||1173
|-
| Juan Vélazc.1174 || || UnknownSon of Vela Ladrón || Unknown || Unknown 
|}

From the year 1200, the County of Álava was fully incorporated into the Kingdom of Castile and the title of Count of Álava ceased to be used.

References

Works cited

See also 

Álava
Kingdom of Navarre

 
Former vassal states
Álava
Basque history